is a former Japanese football player. She played for Japan national team.

Club career
Suzuki was born in Kanagawa Prefecture on January 26, 1982. After graduating from high school, she joined Tasaki Perule FC in 2000. She moved to INAC Leonessa (later INAC Kobe Leonessa) in 2008. She retired in 2009.

National team career
On January 12, 2003, Suzuki debuted for Japan national team against United States. She played 3 games and scored 2 goals for Japan until 2005.

National team statistics

References

External links

1982 births
Living people
Association football people from Kanagawa Prefecture
Japanese women's footballers
Japan women's international footballers
Nadeshiko League players
Tasaki Perule FC players
INAC Kobe Leonessa players
Women's association football forwards